Havana (Spanish: La Habana) is the capital and largest city of Cuba.

Havana, Havanna, Havannah or Habana may also refer to:

Geography

Australia
 Habana, Queensland, a locality in the Mackay Region
 Havannah Island, a small island in the Palm Island group off northern Queensland

Cuba
 La Habana Province
 Habana Formation, a geologic formation in Cuba

Peru
Habana District, Moyobamba

United Kingdom
 Havannah, Cheshire, England

United States
 Havana, Alabama
 Havana, Arkansas
 Havana, Florida
 Havana, Illinois
 Havana, Kansas
 Havana, Minnesota
 Havana on the Hudson, a community in Northeastern New Jersey
 Havana, North Dakota
 Havana, Ohio
 Havana, Oregon
 Havana, Tennessee, a community in Hardin County, Tennessee
 Havana, Texas
 Havana, West Virginia

Breeds and agriculture
 Havana (grape) or Avanà, a red Italian wine grape 
 Havana (rabbit), a breed of rabbit

Music

Albums
 Habana (album), a 1997 album by Roy Hargrove's Crisol
 Havana (soundtrack), a 1990 album by Dave Grusin
 Havana (Tómas R. Einarsson album), 2003

Musicals
 Havana (Edwardian musical), 1908
 Havana, an unperformed musical by Frank Wildhorn

Songs
 "Havana" (Camila Cabello song), 2017
 "Havana" (Kenny G composition), 1997
 "Havana", by Echomen, 2001
 "Habana", by Bebo Valdés from Cuban Dance Party, 1959
 "Habana", by Miguel Bosé from Por vos muero, 2004
 "Hafanana", by Afric Simone, 1975
 "Havana City", by Hilario Durán, 2005
 "Havana Song", by Kurt Weill from Rise and Fall of the City of Mahagonny, 1930

Ships
Habana (steamship), Spanish ship
SS Havana (schooner), Canadian ship

Sports and games
 Habana (baseball club), a baseball team in the old Cuban League
 Havana (board game), a light strategy game
 Havannah (board game), an abstract strategy board game
 Havana (juggling), a club passing pattern for multiple people
 FC La Habana, Cuban football team

Other uses
 Havana (film), a 1990 drama starring Robert Redford
 Havana (novel), a 2003 novel by Stephen Hunter
 Havana (ritual), also known as havanam or homa, a Hindu fire ceremony
 Havanna (Argentine company), an Argentine food products company
 Bryan Habana (born 1983), South African rugby player

See also
 Havana Times, an independent blog
 Little Havana, the Cuban district in Miami, Florida, named after the Cuban capital
 Port Havannah, a place in Vanuatu
 Habano (disambiguation)
 Habanero (disambiguation)
 Habanera (disambiguation)